The 1924 Estonian Football Championship was the fourth top-division football league season in Estonia, organized by the Estonian Football Association. It was played as a knock-out tournament. VS Sport Tallinn won the championship for the third time in four years.

Preliminary matches

Round 1

Round 2

Final
Champion was decided in a play-off series, played until first team reaches two wins.

Top Goalscorer 
 Oskar Üpraus (VS Sport Tallinn) - 6 goals

References

Estonian Football Championship
1